Mokobody  is a town in Siedlce County, Masovian Voivodeship, in east-central Poland, in the historical region of Podlachia. It is the seat of the gmina (administrative district) called Gmina Mokobody.

The town has a population of 1,600.

References

External links
 Jewish Community in Mokobody on Virtual Shtetl

Villages in Siedlce County
Lublin Governorate
Lublin Voivodeship (1919–1939)